Philippine legislative election, 1916 may refer to:
1916 Philippine House of Representatives elections
1916 Philippine Senate elections